Bucculatrix angustisquamella is a moth in the family Bucculatricidae. It is found in North America, where it has been recorded from Utah and British Columbia. The species was first described in 1925 by Annette Frances Braun.

The wingspan is 7.5–8 mm.

References

Natural History Museum Lepidoptera generic names catalog

Bucculatricidae
Moths described in 1925
Moths of North America
Taxa named by Annette Frances Braun